Malana may refer to

 Basti Malana - a town in Punjab, Pakistan
 Malana, Himachal Pradesh - an ancient village in India
 Malana, Khyber Pakhtunkhwa - a town in NWFP, Pakistan
 Parachinar Malana - a town in Kurram Agency, Pakistan